Olena Oleksandrivna Nepochatenko is a Ukrainian agricultural economist and academic administrator. She is the rector of Uman National University of Horticulture since 2013. Nepochatenko specializes the study of lending to agricultural enterprises, taxation of agricultural producers, loans, and agricultural leasing.

References 

Living people
Year of birth missing (living people)
Place of birth missing (living people)
Women heads of universities and colleges
Heads of universities and colleges in Ukraine
21st-century Ukrainian women scientists
Ukrainian women economists
21st-century Ukrainian economists
Agricultural economists
Women agronomists
Ukrainian agronomists